The Garden State Film Festival is a film festival in the United States held in Asbury Park, New Jersey which debuts more than 200 independent films annually over four days each spring.

The festival was founded in 2002 in Sea Girt, New Jersey by Diane Raver and Hollywood actor Robert Pastorelli.  Pastorelli and Raver mounted the first festival in 2003.
As of 2021, the Executive Director is Lauren Concar Sheehy.

The festival pays tribute to Jersey’s legacy as the birthplace of the American filmmaking in Thomas Edison’s Menlo Park laboratories, to Fort Lee, where the studios were founded, and participants frequently include a New Jersey tie. The festival is one of Asbury Park's major cultural and economic forces.  

In 2021, the festival began including screenings at the century-old Cranford movie theater in Cranford, New Jersey.

See also

Television and film in New Jersey
Golden Door Film Festival
New Jersey Film Festival

References

External links

Film festivals in New Jersey
Tourist attractions in Monmouth County, New Jersey
Film festivals established in 2002
Asbury Park, New Jersey
2002 establishments in New Jersey

Independent films